Michael Andrew Whitt is an American banker, politician, and a Republican member of the Alabama House of Representatives, representing District 6. Whitt is chair of the Economic Development and Tourism committee and the vice chair of the house financial services committee. 
Rep. Whitt is also a member of the Alabama Commission on the Evaluation of Services.

Personal life
Whitt is an eighth generation Alabamian and a lifelong resident of Madison County, Al. He is a 1993 graduate of Sparkman High School, attended Calhoun Community College and Louisiana State University (LSU). He was the vice president of the First American Bank from 1996 to 2008, and has been the senior vice president and Madison County Executive of the First National Bank since 2008. Whitt is married to his high school sweetheart, Jennifer Hilliard Whitt. They have 2 children.

References

External links
Andy Whitt at Vote Smart
 https://evidence.alabama.gov/

Republican Party members of the Alabama House of Representatives
Louisiana State University alumni
American bankers
Living people
21st-century American politicians
1974 births